The 1954 GP Ouest-France was the 18th edition of the GP Ouest-France cycle race and was held on 31 August 1954. The race started and finished in Plouay. The race was won by Ugo Anzile.

General classification

References

1954
1954 in road cycling
1954 in French sport